Verses is the debut album by American jazz trumpeter Wallace Roney which was recorded in 1987 and released on the Muse label.

Reception

The AllMusic review by Scott Yanow stated, "The music is essentially advanced hard bop, with Roney as usual often sounding a bit tonewise like his hero Miles Davis".

Track listing
 "Float" (Cindy Blackman) − 5:43
 "Verses" (Wallace Roney) − 9:37
 "Blue in Green" (Bill Evans) − 5:39
 "Topaz" (Blackman) − 5:37
 "Lawra" (Tony Williams) − 6:36
 "Slaves" (Roney) − 12:18

Personnel 
Wallace Roney − trumpet
Gary Thomas − tenor saxophone
Mulgrew Miller − piano 
Charnett Moffett − bass
Tony Williams − drums

References 

1987 debut albums
Wallace Roney albums
Albums recorded at Van Gelder Studio
Albums produced by Michael Cuscuna
Muse Records albums